Anthony "Tony" Maglica (Croatian:  Ante Maglica) (born 1930) is the owner and founder of Mag Instrument Inc, the company that manufactures the Maglite flashlight which was designed by Maglica. The Maglite is a powerful and durable flashlight that has become standard issue gear used by police officers in the USA.

Early life
Although born in New York City, Maglica grew up on the island of Zlarin, which is off the coast of Croatia. During the Great Depression, his family returned to their homeland. World War II ravaged Croatia, and in 1950 he returned to the United States, settling in Ontario, California. Speaking little English, he obtained work as a machinist. While working there, he learned that one of his bosses operated a side business machining hydraulic parts. Tony learned of a metal lathe for sale for $1000 and convinced the seller to accept a $125 deposit, most of his money at the time, with the remainder being paid off with monthly payments.

That business grew into his own machine shop which he incorporated in 1974 called Mag Instrument Inc. Here he met Claire Halasz, his future partner in life and in business, when he hired her to decorate his machine shop. Although they didn't marry, Claire would eventually reside with him and take his surname. She had two sons, Stephen and Christopher, and one daughter, Jackie, who would come to know Tony as their stepfather.

Family Affairs
As the Maglite became popular and the company grew, Mag Instruments Inc. became a family operated company with Tony as President, Claire operating the marketing, personnel and purchasing departments, and Claire's sons, Stephen and Christopher Halasz, holding positions in the company as Vice President and Director of Research and Development, respectively.

In 1992 though, there was a shakeup at the company when Claire discovered that Tony had been arranging to leave the company to his children from a previous marriage upon his death. This started a bitter family battle that would last over a decade and result in Claire and her sons leaving the company, Claire filing a palimony lawsuit against Tony for $200 million, and Claire's sons starting their own flashlight company in 1997.

Palimony lawsuit
In 1992, after learning of Maglica's business plans, their relationship ended and Claire filed a palimony suit for, among other things, breach of contract, breach of partnership agreement, fraud, breach of fiduciary duty and quantum meruit in Orange County Superior Court seeking $200 million in damages. The lawsuit went to jury trial, covered by Court TV to large and involved audiences, awarded Claire $84 million in the Spring of 1994.

The judgment was appealed to the California Courts of Appeal where, in 1998, was reversed and remanded. The court stated that the award was incorrect because the damages should have been the value of her services, not the amount of the benefit of her services. After being remanded and requiring a new trial, Claire settled with Mag Instrument Inc in 2000 for $29 million.

Claire's sons and Bison Sportslights, Inc.
Claire's sons, Stephen and Christopher Halasz, were eventually forced to leave their positions at Mag Instrument, Inc. due to the souring relationship with Tony Maglica. In 1997, the brothers founded Bison Sportslights Inc in Denver, Colorado, seeking to remedy the problem of the "flashlight blackhole"; the dark area at the center of lens adjustable flashlights. The brothers released a product that demonstrated some efficacy to the problem, but were sued in 2002 by Mag Instrument Inc in Mag Instrument Inc. v. Bison Sportslights Inc et al. Central District Court of California, Case # CV-023187 for stealing trade secrets learned while working at Mag Instrument, Inc. and trying to poach employees.

Bison Sportslights, Inc. were found liable for willful and malicious misappropriation of trade secrets, malicious breach of confidence, malicious false advertising, and malicious unfair competition. Bison had a permanent injunction entered against it and Mag Instrument, Inc. was awarded $1.2 million for damages and attorney's fees.

Bison Sportslights, Inc. is no longer in business.

References

External links
Mag Instrument, Inc. - Manufacturer of the Maglite Flashlight
Success Hall of Fame-Anthony Maglica

1930 births
Living people
American expatriates in Yugoslavia
American manufacturing businesspeople
Date of birth missing (living people)
Businesspeople from New York (state)
People from Ontario, California